Join Together may refer to:

"Join Together" (The Who song), 1972
Join Together (album), a 1990 live album by The Who
"Join Together" (Steve Allen song), 1974